Mannosulfan (INN) is an alkylating agent with the potential for the treatment of cancer.  It is not approved by the United States FDA for cancer treatment.  Research suggests it is less toxic than the alkyl sulfonate Busulfan.

References

External links

Alkylsulfonates
Mesylate esters
Monosaccharides
Alkylating antineoplastic agents
Sugar alcohols